Tharindu is a Sinhalese first name with its literal meaning being "Moon".

Tharindu Eranga, Sri Lankan footballer 
Tharindu Fernando, Italian cricketer
Tharindu Fernando, Sri Lankan cricketer
Tharindu Kaushal, Sri Lankan cricketer
Tharindu Wimaladasa, Sri Lankan cricketer

Sinhalese masculine given names